The women's 100 metre butterfly event at the 1960 Olympic Games took place on August 29 and August 30. This swimming event used the butterfly stroke. Because an Olympic size swimming pool is 50 metres long, this race consisted of two lengths of the pool.

Medalists

Results

Heats
Eight fastest swimmers advanced directly to the finals

Heat 1

Heat 2

Heat 3

Heat 4

Final

Wood was in second place after 70 metres, but swallowed too much water, became confused, and stopped swimming.

Key:  DNF = Did not finish, OR = Olympic record

References

External links
Women 100m Butterfly Swimming Olympic Games 1960 Roma (ITA) - Tuesday 30.08; retrieved 2015-01-03

Women's buterfly 100 metre
Women's 100 metre butterfly
1960 in women's swimming
Women's events at the 1960 Summer Olympics